This is a list of notable radio stations that broadcast on FM frequency 106.8 MHz:

China (mainland) 
 CNR Music Radio in Guilin
 CNR The Voice of China in Mudanjiang
 TJTRS Tianjin Traffic Radio

Hong Kong
 RTHK Radio 3

Ireland
 Sunshine 106.8 in Dublin

Lithuania
 M-1

Malaysia
 Gegar in Kuala Terengganu, Terengganu

New Zealand
 George FM (Taranaki frequency)

Russia
 Europa Plus (Kazan frequency)

United Kingdom
 More Radio Mid-Sussex (Lewes frequency)
 Sun FM
 Farnborough Airshow Radio
 Jack FM
 Connect Radio 106.8
 KMFM Shepway and White Cliffs Country (Dover frequency)
 Nation Radio (South East Wales frequency)
 Original 106 (Aberdeen)
 Phonic FM
 Greatest Hits Radio West Yorkshire
 Rinse FM
 Time 106.8 (closed April 2009)

References

Lists of radio stations by frequency